Bartaco, stylized as bartaco, is an American restaurant chain company which focuses on upscale street-style food.

Founded in 2010 by Andy Pforzheimer and Sasa Mahr-Batuz, the restaurant currently operates in 22 locations in 12 states, mostly along the East Coast of the US. The restaurant's first location opened in Port Chester, New York.

In 2019, bartaco was acquired when private equity firm L Catterton purchased Del Frisco's Restaurant Group for $650 million. Bartaco is being run as a separate business under the firm's ownership, alongside Barcelona Wine Bar.

References 

Restaurant chains in the United States
Street food in the United States